The Brabiralung are an Indigenous Australian people, one of the five clans of Gippsland, in the state of Victoria, Australia, belonging to a wider regional grouping known as the Kurnai.

Name
The name Brabiralung is thought to derive from the reduplication of their word for man, namely "bra". Thus doubled, it gives the sense of 'manly.' The suffix -(g)alung denotes 'of' or 'belonging to'.

Language
The Brabiralung language is a dialect of Gunai.

Country
The Brabiralung tribal lands extended over an estimated  of territory embracing Mitchell, Nicholson, and Tambo rivers. Its southern borders ran as far south as the area around Bairnsdale and Bruthen. Their western borders ran west of the Mitchell to Providence Ponds and along the edges of the Gippsland Lakes.

People
A Brabiralung man, Tulaba, who later became an important informant for one of the founding fathers of Australian ethnography. He generally stayed clear of missions such as those at Lake Tyers and Ramahyuck missions, the reserves where many remnants of the Victorian tribes were herded into. He encountered Alfred William Howitt near Bairnsdale around 1866 when the latter established a hops farm, and was engaged as overseer for the indigenous hops pickers employed there. In his two employers, the MacLeods and Howitt, Tulaba found people who either did not meddle in native ways, or positively encouraged their retention, and Howitt assumed a tribal kinship role in his relationship with Tulaba, overcoming the latter's reluctance to have him observe the initiation rites, and placing them in a (jerra-eil) relationship.) The information Tulaba provided in exchange for food and clothing, using a match-stick system Howitt deployed to delineate genealogical structures, played a seminal function in Howitt's thinking about the aboriginal kinship systems. Tulaba died due to cancer at the Lake Tyers Mission in 1886 and was buried according to Anglican rites.

Alternative names
 Brabirrawulung, Brabriwoolong
 Brabrolong
 Brabrolung
 Bundah Wark Kani (i.e., kanai = man)
 Bundhul Wark Kani (horde name)
 Muk-thang (language name),{{efn|kani' here reflects the wordkanai, signifying man }}
 Wakeruk''

Notes

Citations

Sources

Aboriginal peoples of Victoria (Australia)
History of Victoria (Australia)